The Queen & I is an American television sitcom which aired on CBS from January 16 until April 3, 1969. It starred Larry Storch as a junior officer serving a once popular but now aging and run-down cruise ship, the Amsterdam Queen. When he finds out the new owners intend to sell the ship for scrap, he and the rest of the crew involve themselves a number of "get rich quick" schemes in an attempt to save their ship.

Duffy's efforts to raise money often coincided with his gambling and other personal scams. He and the crew were opposed by first officer Oliver Nelson (Billy De Wolfe), the main antagonist, who was highly suspicious of Duffy's activities and often sought to put an end to them.

History
Although Storch and De Wolfe were the main stars, the series had a strong supporting cast that included familiar character actors Liam Dunn, Dave Morick, Pat Morita (later of Happy Days), Chet Stratton, Carl Ballantine, and Dave Willock. Other supporting roles were played by British actor Reginald Owen and American television actresses Barbara Stuart, Janet Clark and Natalie Masters.

First airing on January 16, 1969, The Queen & I was originally intended to replace the sitcom Blondie midway through the 1968–69 season. Although it received some positive reviews, including being featured on the covers of TV Times  and TV Magazine, it failed to catch on with viewers and was canceled after 11 episodes (two episodes never aired). The series, however, served as a prelude to The Love Boat which debuted eight years later.

Cast and characters
Larry Storch as Charles Duffy
Billy De Wolfe as First Officer Oliver Nelson
Carl Ballantine as Becker
Pat Morita as Barney
Barbara Stuart as Wilma Winslow
Dave Morick as Max Kowalski
Liam Dunn as Capt. Washburn
Dave Willock as Ozzie

Episodes

References

External links
 
 
 The Classic TV Archive – US Comedy Series: The Queen and I
 The Queen and I opening credits on YouTube

1969 American television series debuts
1969 American television series endings
CBS original programming
1960s American sitcoms
English-language television shows
1960s American workplace comedy television series
Television series by CBS Studios
Nautical television series